Abele Nunatak is a nunatak lying  east of Hutcheson Nunataks at the head of Balchen Glacier, in Marie Byrd Land. It was mapped using surveys made by the United States Geological Survey (USGS) and U.S. Navy aerial photos from 1959 to 1965, and later named by the Advisory Committee on Antarctic Names (US-ACAN) after C.A. Abele, Jr., a member of the Byrd Antarctic Expedition (1933–35).

Nunataks of Marie Byrd Land